Walter Thomas Conner (1877-1952) was a prominent Baptist theologian and educator on the faculty of the Southwestern Baptist Theological Seminary at Fort Worth, Texas, from 1910 to 1949. He based his theological systems on those of his teachers, Benajah Harvey Carroll of Baylor University, Augustus Hopkins Strong at Rochester Theological Seminary, and Edgar Young Mullins, of Louisville.  Conner was also influenced by personalism, His theology stressed the moral self consistency of the divine attributes. His writings emphasized the idea of   "Christus victor" ("Victorious Christ"). Conner was a moderate Calvinist, but said little about the issue of biblical inspiration. He shifted away from "postmillennialism" to amillennialism.  Conner in 1945 depicted "evangelistic and missionary activity" as a sharing of the cross of Christ and treated the bringing of "others
to know and serve Christ" as an aspect of "the Christian's mission and work."

Selected bibliography
 The Resurrection of Jesus (1926,Sunday School Board of the Southern Baptist Convention)
 Revelation and God: An Introduction to Christian Doctrine (1936 - Broadman Press)
 Christian Doctrine (1937, Broadman Press, reprinted 1998)
 The Christ We Need" (1938, Zondervan Publishing)
 The Faith of the New Testament (1940 - Broadman Press)
 The Gospel of Redemption (1945 - Broadman Press)
 The Work of the Holy Spirit (1949, Broadman Press)
 The Cross in the New Testament Introduction By Jesse J. Northcutt (1954, Broadman Press)

Notes

 Further reading
 Draughon, Walter D. A critical evaluation of the diminishing influence of Calvinism on the doctrine of atonement in representative Southern Baptist theologians: James Petigru Boyce, Edgar Young Mullins, Walter Thomas Conner, and Dale Moody. Diss. Southwestern Baptist Theological Seminary, 1987.
 Garrett, James Leo. "Walter Thomas Conner." in Baptist Theologians (1990) pp: 419-33.
 Hurst, Clyde J. "The Problem of Religious Knowledge in the Theology of Edgar Young Mullins and Walter Thomas Conner." Review & Expositor  52.2 (1955): 166-182.
 Newman, Stewart A. W. T. Conner: Theologian of the Southwest'' (1964)
 Sampler, Jason Boone. "A Critical Analysis of the Doctrine of Atonement Within the Writings of Walter Thomas Conner". Diss. New Orleans Baptist Theological Seminary, 2003.

1877 births
1952 deaths
Southern Baptist ministers
American Baptist theologians
Southern Baptist Theological Seminary alumni
Southern Baptists
Baptists from Texas